The Scout and Guide movement in Uganda is served by
 The Uganda Girl Guides Association, member of the World Association of Girl Guides and Girl Scouts
 The Uganda Scouts Association, member of the World Organization of the Scout Movement

See also